Thiemo-Jérôme Kialka (born 12 January 1989) is German former professional footballer who played as a forward. He made his professional debut with Jahn Regensburg on 31 January 2012 in a 3. Liga match against VfB Stuttgart II.

References

External links 
 
 

1989 births
Living people
Footballers from Hamburg
German sportspeople of Ghanaian descent
German footballers
Association football forwards
2. Bundesliga players
3. Liga players
VfL 93 Hamburg players
1. FC Köln players
1. FC Köln II players
SSV Jahn Regensburg players
SC Fortuna Köln players